

The Grahame-White Type X Charabanc or Aerobus was a 1910s British passenger-carrying biplane designed and built by the Grahame-White Aviation Company based at Hendon Aerodrome, North London.

Development
The Charabanc was built by the Grahame-White company to meet the demand for passenger-carrying flights, which could not be satisfied by the existing two-seat designs. Designed by J. D. North, it was an unequal-span pusher biplane, with ailerons on both upper and lower wings, and a biplane tail unit with three rudders mounted on booms. An elongated nacelle mounted on the lower wing housed the pilot in the front, plus four passengers in two rows of two seats behind.  The wing spars, tail booms and outer interplane struts were of hollow section spruce, and the nacelle and inner struts were of ash.

It first flew in 1913, powered by a 120 hp (89 kW) Austro-Daimler engine, and in this form was flown by Louis Noel with seven passengers aboard to set a British world record on 22 September 1913. On 2 October 1913, he set a world record in carrying nine passengers, staying aloft for nearly twenty minutes. To meet the entry requirements for the 1913 Michelin Cup, which required an all-British aircraft, this was replaced by a British-built 100 hp (75 kW) Green E.6 engine. The Charabanc went on to win the cup, covering a distance of over 300 miles on 9 November 1913, piloted by R.H. Carr.

Specifications

Notes

References
 Lewis, Peter M. H. British Aircraft 1809-1914 London: Putnam, 1962 p. 284-285
 The Illustrated Encyclopedia of Aircraft (Part Work 1982-1985), 1985, Orbis Publishing, Page 1998

External links
 The Grahame White Aero-Char-a-BancsFlight magazine 11 October 1913 p. 1113.

1910s British airliners
Grahame-White aircraft
Aircraft first flown in 1913